This article lists multi-sport events held by the People's Republic of China (PRC), including Hong Kong (after 1997) and Macau (after 1999).

Beijing

Tianjin

Shanghai

Jilin

Heilongjiang

Jiangsu

Zhejiang

Fujian

Shandong

Hubei

Guangdong

Sichuan

Hong Kong

Macau

See also
List of multi-sport events

Notes

Multi-sport events in China